This is a list of notable British film studios.

 3 Mills Studios – Bow, London
 Aardman Animations – Bristol
 Beaconsfield Film Studios – Beaconsfield, Buckinghamshire
 Bray Studios – Windsor, Berkshire
 Bushey Studios – Bushey, Hertfordshire
 British and Dominions Imperial Studios – Borehamwood, Hertfordshire
 British National Studios (formerly known as Rock Studios) – Borehamwood, Hertfordshire
 Catford Studios – Catford, London
 Cricklewood Studios – Cricklewood, London
 Denham Film Studios – Denham, Buckinghamshire
 Dickenson Road Studios, Rusholme, Manchester 
 Disney UK – Hammersmith, London
 Dragon International Film Studios – Llanilid, Wales
 Ealing Studios – Ealing, London
 Elstree Film Studios (Associated British Picture Corporation) – Borehamwood, Hertfordshire
 Elstree Studios for other facilities in the Elstree and Borehamwood area
 Gainsborough Studios (formerly known as Islington Studios) – Hoxton, London
 Gate Studios – Borehamwood, Hertfordshire
 Heyday Films – Borehamwood, Hertfordshire
 Highbury Studios –  Highbury, London
 Isleworth Studios – Isleworth, London
 Kew Bridge Studios – Kew Bridge, London
 Lime Grove Studios – Shepherd's Bush, London
 Locksmith Animation – 113 Regent's Park Road, London
 Longcross Studios – Chertsey, Surrey
 Marylebone Studios – London
 Merton Park Studios – South Wimbledon, London
 MGM-British Studios – Borehamwood, Hertfordshire (post-war)
 Nettlefold Studios – Walton-on-Thames, Surrey
 New Elstree Studios – Elstree, Hertfordshire
 Pinewood Studios – Iver Heath, Buckinghamshire
 Riverside Studios – Hammersmith, London
 Rebellion Film Studios – Oxford
 Sands Films Studio– Rotherhithe, London
 Seren Stiwdios (formerly Pinewood Studio Wales) – St Mellons, Cardiff
 Shepperton Studios – Shepperton, Surrey
 Southall Studios – Southall, London
 Twickenham Film Studios – Twickenham, London
 Universal Pictures International (UPI) – St. Giles, London
 Walthamstow Studios – Walthamstow, London
 Warner Bros. Studios, Leavesden (formerly known as Leavesden Film Studios) – Hertfordshire
 Welwyn Studios – Welwyn Garden City, Hertfordshire
 Wembley Studios – Wembley Park, London
 West London Film Studios – Hayes, Hillingdon, London
 Wimbledon Studios – Merton, London

External links
 Studios at Britmovie.co.uk

 
Studios